The 2011–12 HRV Cup (named after the competition's sponsor HRV) was the seventh season of the Men's Super Smash Twenty20 cricket tournament in New Zealand.  The season was played between 18 December 2011 and 22 January 2012. The winners of the tournament were the Auckland Aces who beat the Canterbury Wizards by 44 runs in the final.

Teams

Standings

League Progression

Results

Final

Super Smash (cricket)
HRV Cup
2011–12 New Zealand cricket season